Gejje Pooje is a 1969 Indian Kannada language film directed by Puttanna Kanagal and produced by Rashi Brothers. The film stars Kalpana, Gangadhar and Leelavathi in the lead roles. The film is based on the novel Gejje Pooje, by M. K. Indira. The film was remade in Tamil as Thaaliya Salangaiya, in Telugu as Kalyana Mandapam  and in Hindi as Ahista Ahista.

Plot 
This socially relevant film explores the problem of prostitutes. It was based on the novel written by M. K. Indira. The heroine Chandramukhi (played by Kalpana) is the daughter of a devadasi who falls in love with a young man who is her neighbour, as they grew up together. The young girl understands the value of education and with the support of her mother intends to reject the life of prostitution. Circumstances and the young man's suspicion makes him abandon the heroine. The girl he then goes on to marry is actually her half-sister, the daughter of the heroine's father from his marriage with another woman. He had abandoned both Chandra and her mother. Chandra agrees to perform 'gejje pooje' (literally getting married to ankle bracelets) as part of initiation into a life of prostitution, but in the end, she commits suicide by crushing & swallowing the diamond (from the ring that was gifted to her by her biological father in his memory).

Cast 
 Kalpana as Chandramukhi
 Gangadhar as Somu
 Leelavathi as Aparna, Chandramukhi's mother
 Aarathi as Lalita
 Lokanath as Puttanna Shettru
 Pandari Bai as Tangamma, Somu's mother
 K. S. Ashwath as Somu's father
 Annapoornamma as Chandra's grandmother
 Swarnamma
 M. N. Lakshmi Devi as Savitri
 Balakrishna as Savitri's husband
 B. V. Radha
 Vajramuni

Awards 
17th National Film Awards
 Best Kannada Film
 Best Screenplay — Puttanna Kanagal

1969–70 Karnataka State Film Awards
 First Best Film
 Best Supporting Actress – Leelavathi
 Best Screenplay — Puttanna Kanagal
 Best Dialogue — Navarathna Ram Rao
 Best Cinematographer — S. V. Srikanth

Soundtrack 
The music was composed by Vijaya Bhaskar.

Notes

References

External links 
 

1969 films
1960s Kannada-language films
Films based on Indian novels
Films directed by Puttanna Kanagal
Kannada films remade in other languages
Films scored by Vijaya Bhaskar
Kannada literature
Films whose writer won the Best Original Screenplay National Film Award
Best Kannada Feature Film National Film Award winners